Goeridae is a family of caddisflies in the order Trichoptera. There are about 12 genera and at least 160 described species in Goeridae.

The type genus for Goeridae is Goera J.F. Stephens, 1829.

Genera

References

Further reading

 
 
 
 
 
 
 
 

Trichoptera families
Integripalpia